The 2007–08 season was the 86th season of competitive association football and fourth season in the Football Conference played by York City Football Club, a professional football club based in York, North Yorkshire, England. They finished in 17th place in the 24-team 2007–08 Conference Premier.

York entered the 2007–08 FA Cup in the fourth qualifying round, losing to Havant & Waterlooville at home. They reached the semi-final of the 2007–08 FA Trophy, being beaten by Torquay United. York were knocked out in the fifth round of the 2007–08 Conference League Cup, after a penalty shoot-out defeat at home to Northwich Victoria.

34 players made at least one appearance in nationally organised first-team competition, and there were 16 different goalscorers. Winger Martyn Woolford played in all 57 first-team matches over the season. Onome Sodje and Woolford finished as joint top scorers with 17 goals each. Sodje scored 14 in league competition, two in the FA Cup and one in the Conference League Cup, while Woolford scored 14 in league competition, two in the FA Trophy and one in the Conference League Cup. The winner of the Clubman of the Year award was David McGurk.

Background and pre-season

York retained the previous season's home and away kits. The home kit included red shirts with a white collar, bar a section under the neck which was red, and white trims on the sleeves, white shorts and red socks. The away kit comprised yellow shirts with a green collar, bar a section under the neck which was yellow, and white trims on the sleeves, blue shorts and blue socks. A third kit was used this season, which included light blue shirts with a maroon collar, bar a section under the neck which was light blue, and maroon trims on the sleeves, maroon shorts and light blue socks. CLP Industries continued as shirt sponsors for the third successive season.

Match details
Dates are sourced by Batters. League positions are sourced by Statto. The remaining information is referenced individually.

Conference Premier

League table (part)

FA Cup

FA Trophy

Conference League Cup

Transfers

In

 Brackets around club names denote the player's contract with that club had expired before he joined York.

Out

 Brackets around club names denote the player joined that club after his York contract expired.

Loans in

Loans out

Appearances and goals
Source:

Numbers in parentheses denote appearances as substitute.
Players with names struck through and marked  left the club during the playing season.
Players with names in italics and marked * were on loan from another club for the whole of their season with York.
Players listed with no appearances have been in the matchday squad but only as unused substitutes.
Key to positions: GK – Goalkeeper; DF – Defender; MF – Midfielder; FW – Forward

See also
List of York City F.C. seasons

References

York City F.C. seasons
York City
Foot